Ron Willett (birth registered fourth ¼ 1944) is an English former professional rugby league footballer who played in the 1960s.

Background
Ron Willett's birth was registered in Pontefract district, West Riding of Yorkshire, England.

Playing career

County League appearances
Ron Willett played in Castleford's victory in the Yorkshire County League during the 1964–65 season.

BBC2 Floodlit Trophy Final appearances
Ron Willett played left-, i.e. number 4, and scored 2-goals in Castleford's 4-0 victory over St. Helens in the 1965 BBC2 Floodlit Trophy Final during the 1965–66 season at Knowsley Road, St. Helens on Tuesday 14 December 1965, played left-, i.e. number 4, and scored a goal in the 7-2 victory over Swinton in the 1966 BBC2 Floodlit Trophy Final during the 1966–67 season at Wheldon Road, Castleford on Tuesday 20 December 1966, and played , i.e. number 5, and scored 4-goals in the 8-5 victory over Leigh in the 1967 BBC2 Floodlit Trophy Final during the 1967–68 season at Headingley Rugby Stadium, Leeds on Saturday 16 January 1968. The record for the most goals in a BBC2 Floodlit Trophy Final is 4-goals, and is jointly held by; Ron Willett, Kel Coslett and Dave Hall.

References

External links
Search for "Willett" at rugbyleagueproject.org

1944 births
Living people
Castleford Tigers players
English rugby league players
Rugby league centres
Rugby league players from Pontefract
Rugby league wingers